Global Mission (Jiguchon) Church is a Baptist megachurch located in Bundang, a suburb of Seoul, South Korea.

History
It was founded in January 1994 by Daniel Dong-Won Lee.  As of 2011, rev. Daniel Lee entered into early retirement and welcomed Dr. Peter Chin as the new lead pastor. The church is actively involved in world missions, Evangelism Explosion (E.E.) and in 2008 began its first E.E. in English headed by Sansook Ko.  Over 300 members of the Global Missions Church are involved in E.E. 

The church began as a 60-member church dedicated to spreading the gospel through missions with strong focus on cell-church ministry.  In about 10 years, Jiguchon Church (GMC) has expanded tremendously to the tune of over 25,000 people in attendance every Sunday, and with over 30,000 people registered as members.  Currently, Global  Mission Church has Sunday worship in two locations Bundang and Suji. The church also has Global Department with worship services in English, Japanese, Mongolian, Chinese, and Japanese. The English Ministry (GEM) is led by Rev. Stanley Park.

References

External links
Global Mission Church, Silver Spring, MD
Global Mission Church, Suji/Bundang, S. Korea
Light Global Mission Church, Fairfax, VA

Baptist churches in South Korea
Bundang
Christian organizations established in 1994
Churches in Seoul
Buildings and structures in Gyeonggi Province
Evangelical megachurches in South Korea